Meiostylodon is an extinct genus of tillodont that lived during Paleocene. The lone type species, M. zaoshiensis, is known only from three isolated teeth found at Zaoshi, Chaling County, Hunan Province in the People's Republic of China. These isolated fossil teeth are stored at the Paleozoological Museum of China.

References

Meiostylodon at fossilworks
Meiostylodon zaoshiensis at Paleozoological Museum of China official website (Chinese)

Tillodontia
Paleocene mammals
Fossils of China
Fossil taxa described in 1975
Prehistoric mammal genera